The 1864 Vermont gubernatorial election for governor of Vermont took place on September 6. Incumbent J. Gregory Smith was a candidate for reelection to a second one-year term, in keeping with the provisions of the Republican Party's "Mountain Rule". The Democratic nominee was Timothy P. Redfield, a former member of the Vermont Senate, the Free Soil Party's 1851 nominee for governor, and the Democratic nominee in 1863. In the general election, the Republican Party's dominance of Vermont politics continued, and Smith was easily reelected.

Results

References
 

1864
Vermont
Gubernatorial
October 1864 events